Nationality words link to articles with information on the nation's poetry or literature (for instance, Irish or France).

Events

Works published

Colonial America
 Cotton Mather, An Elegy [...] on Nathanael Collins, English Colonial America (Massachusetts)

Germany
 Emilie Juliane of Schwarzburg-Rudolstadt, German:
 Kuhlwasser in grosser Hitze des Creutzes, hymns; published in Rudolstadt
 Tägliches Morgen- Mittags- und Abendopfer, hymns; published in Rudolstadt

Great Britain
 Henry Bold, translator, Latine Songs, with their English: and Poems, includes "Chevy Chase", a ballad, and Sir John Suckling's poem "Why so pale and wan fond lover?"
 John Cutts, (later Baron Cutts), La Muse de Cavalier; or, An Apology for such gentleman as make poetry their diversion, not their business in a letter by a scholar of Mars to one of Apollo, published anonymously
 Sir William Davenant, The Seventh and Last Canto of the Third Book of Gondibert, published posthumously (see Gondibert 1651)
 John Dryden and Jacob Tonson, Sylvae; or, The Second Part of Poetical Miscellanies, the second in a series of miscellanies published by Tonson; has translations from Virgil, Lucretius, Theocritus and Horace, mostly by Dryden (see also Miscellany Poems 1684, Examen Poeticum 1693, Annual Miscellany 1694, Poetical Miscellanies: Fifth Part 1704, Sixth Part 1709)
 Nahum Tate, Poems by Several Hands, and on Several Occasions
 Edmund Waller, Divine Poems
 Samuel Wesley, Maggots; or, Poems on Several Subjects, Never Before Handled, published anonymously
 John Wilmot, Earl of Rochester, Poems on Several Occasions. Written by a late Person of Honour, London: Printed for A. Thorncome, posthumously published

English verses on the death of Charles II and coronation of James II
Charles II of England died on February 6; James II of England was crowned on April 23:
 Edmund Arwaker:
 The Vision
 The Second Part of The Vision, a Pindarick Ode, on the coronation of James II
 Aphra Behn:
 A Pindarick on the Death of Our Late Sovereign
 A Pindarick Poem on the Happy Coronation of His Most Sacred Majesty James II
 John Dryden, Threnodia Augustalis, on the death of Charles II
 Thomas Otway, Windsor Castle, on the death of Charles II; Otway died in April

Gujarat
 Premanand Bhatt, Nalākhyān, Gujarati

Norway
 Dorothe Engelbretsdatter, Taare-Offer, Norwegian

Births
Death years link to the corresponding "[year] in poetry" article:
 February 10 – Aaron Hill (died 1750), English dramatist, poet and miscellaneous writer
 June 30 – John Gay (died 1732), English poet and dramatist
 December 17 – Thomas Tickell (died 1740), English poet and man of letters
 Mary Barber (died 1755), English poet and member of Jonathan Swift's circle
 Jane Brereton (died 1740), English poet notable as a correspondent to The Gentleman's Magazine
 William Diaper (died 1717), English poet of the Augustan era
 William Harrison (died 1713), English poet and diplomat

Deaths
Birth years link to the corresponding "[year] in poetry" article:
 January 18 – Wentworth Dillon, 4th Earl of Roscommon (born 1633), Anglo-Irish poet
 June 16 – Anne Killigrew (born 1660), English poet and painter
 July 1 – Nalan Xingde (born 1655), Chinese Qing dynasty poet most famous for his ci poetry
 October 12 – Gerard Brandt (born 1626), Dutch preacher, playwright, poet, church historian, biographer and naval historian
 Francesc Fontanella (born 1622), Catalan poet, dramatist and priest

See also

 Poetry
 17th century in poetry
 17th century in literature
 Restoration literature

Notes

17th-century poetry
Poetry